Johanan was a Jewish Exilarch of the 2nd century AD succeeding his brother Nahum. according to the Seder Olam Zutta. He is either the son or descendant of Akkub, although more likely he is the son of  Ahijah. The date of his tenure is disputed.

Related Articles
Exilarch
Seder Olam Zutta
List of Babylonian Exilarchs

External Links
Jewish Encyclopedia- Exilarch
 Genealogy of the House of David- Johanan, 3rd Exilarch

References

Exilarchs
2nd-century Jews
Jewish royalty